The Gibson O'Connor North Shore Open or simply North Shore Open is a yearly professional squash tournament held in Auckland, New Zealand at the North Shore Squash Club, Takapuna. It is part of the PSA World Tour and WSA World Tour.

Results
These are the results from 2017 onwards:

2017

See also
 PSA World Tour
 WSA World Tour

References

PSA World Tour
WSA World Tour
Squash tournaments in New Zealand
Women's squash tournaments
Squash in New Zealand